Aces and Eights is a 1936 American film, a Puritan Pictures production directed by Sam Newfield.

Premise
A card sharp steps in when a Mexican family's ranch is threatened by swindlers and cheats.

Cast 
 Tim McCoy as 'Gentleman' Tim Madigan
 Luana Walters as Juanita Hernandez
 Rex Lease as Jose Hernandez
 Wheeler Oakman as Ace Morgan
 J. Frank Glendon as Amos Harden
 Charles Stevens as Captain de Lopez
 Earle Hodgins as Marshal
 Jimmy Aubrey as Sidekick Lucky
 Joseph W. Girard as Don Julio Hernandez
 Karl Hackett as Wild Bill Hickok

References

External links 
 
 
 

1936 films
1936 Western (genre) films
American Western (genre) films
American black-and-white films
1930s English-language films
Films directed by Sam Newfield
1930s American films